Henrichs is the surname of:

 Benjamin Henrichs (born 1997), German footballer
 Bertina Henrichs (born 1966), German writer who writes in French
 Karl-Heinz Henrichs (1942–2008), German racing cyclist

See also
 Henrich, a list of people with the surname or given name
 Heinrichs, a list of people with the surname

Surnames from given names